38 Parrots (translit. Tridtsat vosem popugaev) is a series of ten children's cartoons produced in the Soviet Union between 1976 and 1991 by Soyuzmultfilm. Featuring animated puppets, the series portrays the amusing adventures of four friends: the talkative chimpanzee Martyshka, the shy young elephant Slonyonok, the eccentric parrot Popugai, and the thoughtful boa Udav.

The title of the series comes from the very first episode, where Udav has his length measured in parrots. In most episodes the heroes solve paradoxes related to language and meaning. In one, for example, they discuss the number of nuts it takes to make a whole pile. In another, they tackle the problem of how to convey a greeting without it disappearing in transit.

The series was created by director Ivan Ufimtsev and artist Leonid Shvartsman, and scripted by children's author Grigoriy Oster. The characters were voiced by popular actors Nadezhda Rumyantseva (Martyshka), Mikhail Kozakov (Slonyonok), Vasily Livanov (Udav) and Vsevolod Larionov (Popugai). The series' music is written by Vladimir Shainsky, Gennady Gladkov and Aleksei Shelygin.

List of episodes
 "38 Parrots" / 38 попугаев (July 12, 1976)
 "Udav's Grandmother" / Бабушка удава (April 19, 1977)
 "How to Cure Udav" / Как лечить удава (September 7, 1977)
 "Where is Slonyonok Going" / Куда идёт слонёнок (December 18, 1977)
 "Hello to Martyshka" / Привет мартышке (February 13, 1978)
 "And What if It Works!" / А вдруг получится! (April 12, 1978)
 "Gymnastics for the Tail" / Зарядка для хвоста (March 29, 1979)
 "Tomorrow Will be Tomorrow" / Завтра будет завтра (August 5, 1979)
 "The Great Closure" / Великое закрытие (January 14, 1985)
 "Unobvious Textbook" / Ненаглядное пособие (July 15, 1991)

See also
 History of Russian animation
 List of stop-motion films

References

External links
 

1976 animated films
1976 films
1977 animated films
1977 films
1978 animated films
1978 films
1979 animated films
1979 films
1985 animated films
1985 films
1991 animated films
1991 films
Soviet animated films
1970s stop-motion animated films
Soyuzmultfilm
Fictional parrots